André Titos (born 19 February 1958) is a Mozambican sprinter. He competed in the men's 4 × 400 metres relay at the 1984 Summer Olympics.

References

External links
 

1958 births
Living people
Athletes (track and field) at the 1984 Summer Olympics
Mozambican male sprinters
Mozambican male middle-distance runners
Olympic athletes of Mozambique
Place of birth missing (living people)